Adaptation is a 2002 American meta comedy-drama film directed by Spike Jonze and written by Charlie Kaufman. It features an ensemble cast including Nicolas Cage, Meryl Streep, and Chris Cooper, with Cara Seymour, Brian Cox, Tilda Swinton, Ron Livingston, and Maggie Gyllenhaal in supporting roles.

Kaufman based Adaptation on his struggles to adapt Susan Orlean's 1998 nonfiction book The Orchid Thief while suffering from writer's block. It involves elements adapted from the book, plus fictitious elements, including Kaufman's twin brother (also credited as a writer for the film) and a romance between Orlean and Laroche. It culminates in completely invented elements, including versions of Orlean and Laroche three years after the events of The Orchid Thief.

Adaptation was praised for its direction, screenplay, humor, and the performances of Cage, Cooper, and Streep. It received awards at the 75th Academy Awards, 60th Golden Globe Awards, and 56th British Academy Film Awards, with Cooper winning the Academy Award for Best Supporting Actor and Kaufman winning the BAFTA Award for Best Adapted Screenplay. A British Film Institute poll ranked it one of the thirty best films of the 2000s.

Plot
Self-loathing screenwriter Charlie Kaufman is hired to write the screenplay adaptation of Susan Orlean's The Orchid Thief. He struggles with anxiety, social phobia, depression, and low self-esteem. His twin brother, Donald, has moved into his house and is freeloading there. Donald decides to become a screenwriter like Charlie and attends seminars by screenwriting guru Robert McKee.

Charlie, who rejects formulaic scriptwriting, wants to ensure that his script is a faithful adaptation of The Orchid Thief but comes to feel that the book does not have a usable narrative and is impossible to turn into a film, which leaves him with a serious case of writer's block. Already well past his deadline with Columbia Pictures and despairing of writing his script with self-reference, Charlie travels to New York City to discuss the screenplay with Orlean directly. Too shy and socially awkward to speak with her upon arriving at her office and after he received the surprising news that Donald's spec script for a clichéd psychological thriller, The 3, is selling for six or seven figures, Charlie resorts to attending McKee's seminar in New York and asks him for advice. Charlie ends up asking Donald to join him in New York to assist with the story structure.

Donald, who is confident socially, pretends to be Charlie and interviews Orlean but finds her responses suspicious. He and Charlie follow Orlean to Florida, where she meets John Laroche, the orchid-stealing protagonist of her book and her secret lover. It is revealed that the Seminole wanted the ghost orchid to manufacture a mind-altering drug that causes fascination. Laroche introduces the drug to Orlean. After Laroche and Orlean catch Charlie observing them taking the drug and having sex, Orlean decides that Charlie must be killed to prevent him from potentially exposing them.

Orlean forces Charlie to drive to the swamp at gunpoint, intending to kill him. Charlie and Donald escape and hide in the swamp, where they resolve their differences. Laroche accidentally shoots Donald. Charlie and Donald drive off but collide head-on with a ranger's truck. Donald is ejected through the windshield and dies moments later, but Charlie is saved by the airbag and runs into the swamp to hide. There he is spotted by Laroche, who is killed by an alligator before he can kill Charlie.

Orlean is arrested. Charlie reconciles with his mother as he calls to inform her of Donald's death. He later tells his former love interest, Amelia, that he loves her. She responds that she loves him too. Charlie finishes the script, which ends with him announcing in a voice-over that the script is finished and that for the first time, he is filled with hope.

Cast

 Nicolas Cage as Charlie Kaufman and Donald Kaufman
 Meryl Streep as Susan Orlean
 Chris Cooper as John Laroche
 Cara Seymour as Amelia Kavan
 Brian Cox as Robert McKee
 Tilda Swinton as Valerie Thomas
 Ron Livingston as Marty Bowen
 Maggie Gyllenhaal as Caroline Cunningham
 Judy Greer as Alice
 Bob Yerkes as Charles Darwin
 Jim Beaver as Ranger Tony
 Litefoot as Russell
 Jay Tavare as Matthew Osceola
 Doug Jones as Augustus Margary
 Peter Jason as Defense Attorney
 Gary Farmer as Buster Baxley

Tom Hanks was originally set for the double role of Charlie and Donald Kaufman. Cage took the role for a $5 million salary, and wore a fatsuit during filming.

Streep expressed strong interest in the role of Susan Orlean before being cast, and took a salary cut in recognition of the film's budget. John Turturro was approached to portray John Laroche. Cooper strongly considered turning down Laroche, but accepted it after his wife urged him to. Albert Finney, Christopher Plummer, Terence Stamp and Michael Caine were considered for the role of Robert McKee, but McKee personally suggested Brian Cox to filmmakers.

John Cusack, Catherine Keener, John Malkovich, Lance Acord, Thomas Patrick Smith, and Spike Jonze have uncredited cameos as themselves in scenes where Charlie Kaufman is on the set of Being John Malkovich, which he also wrote. Additional cameos include director Curtis Hanson as Orlean's husband, and David O. Russell as a New Yorker journalist.

Production

The idea to do a film adaptation of Susan Orlean's The Orchid Thief dates back to 1994. Fox 2000 purchased the film rights in 1997, eventually selling them to Jonathan Demme, who set the project at Columbia Pictures. Charlie Kaufman was hired to write the script, but struggled with the adaptation and writer's block. Kaufman eventually created a script of his experience in adaptation, exaggerating events and creating a fictional twin brother. He put Donald Kaufman's name on the script and dedicated the film to him. By September 1999, Kaufman had written two drafts of the script; he turned in a third draft in November 2000.

Kaufman said, "The idea of how to write the film didn't come to me until quite late. It was the only idea I had, I liked it, and I knew there was no way it would be approved if I pitched it. So I just wrote it and never told the people I was writing it for. I only told Spike Jonze, as we were making Being John Malkovich and he saw how frustrated I was. Had he said I was crazy, I don't know what I would have done". He also said, "I really thought I was ending my career by turning that in!"

Adaptation went on fast track in April 2000, with Kaufman making some revisions. Scott Brake of IGN gave the script a positive review in June 2000, as did Drew McWeeny of Ain't It Cool News in October. Columbia Pictures committed to North America distribution only after Intermedia came aboard to finance the film in exchange for international distribution rights. Filming started in late March 2001 in Los Angeles and finished by June. The "evolution" fantasy sequence was created by Digital Domain, while Skywalker Sound handled audio post production services.
The makeup effects (the Nicolas Cage double, Chris Cooper's teeth, and the alligator attack) are by makeup effects designer Tony Gardner and his effects company Alterian, Inc.

Release
Columbia Pictures at one point announced a late 2001 theatrical release date, but Adaptation opened on December 6, 2002, in the United States for a limited release. The film was released nationwide on February 14, 2003, earning $1,130,480 in its opening weekend in 672 theaters. It went on to gross $22.5 million in North America and $10.3 million in foreign countries, for a total of $32.8 million.

Home media
Adaptation was released on DVD and VHS by Columbia TriStar Home Entertainment in May 2003. Image Entertainment released a bare-bones Blu-ray in 2012, which was followed in 2020 by another release through Shout! Factory.

Reception

Critical response

On Rotten Tomatoes, the film has an approval rating of 91% based on 211 reviews, with an average rating of 8.2/10. The site's critical consensus reads: "Dizzyingly original, the loopy, multi-layered Adaptation is both funny and thought-provoking." On Metacritic, the film has a weighted average score of 83 out of 100, based on 40 critics, indicating "universal acclaim." Audiences polled by CinemaScore gave the film an average grade of "C" on an A+ to F scale.

Roger Ebert of the Chicago Sun-Times gave the film four out of four stars, writing that it "leaves you breathless with curiosity, as it teases itself with the directions it might take. To watch the film is to be actively involved in the challenge of its creation." He later added the film to his "Great Movies" collection. At the end of 2009, Ebert named the film one of the best of the decade. Peter Travers of Rolling Stone also gave the film a four-star rating, writing, "Screenwriting this smart, inventive, passionate and rip-roaringly funny is a rare species. So all praise to Charlie Kaufman, working with director Spike Jonze to create the most original and outrageous film comedy since the two first teamed on Being John Malkovich, in 1999." Wesley Morris of The Boston Globe wrote, "This is epic, funny, tragic, demanding, strange, original, boldly sincere filmmaking. And the climax, the portion that either sinks the entire movie or self-critically explains how so many others derail, is bananas."

David Ansen of Newsweek wrote that Meryl Streep had not "been this much fun to watch in years", while Mike Clark of USA Today gave a largely negative review, mainly criticizing the ending: "Too smart to ignore but a little too smugly superior to like, this could be a movie that ends up slapping its target audience in the face by shooting itself in the foot." Stanley Kauffmann of The New Republic wrote, "Adaptation is almost juvenile showing off—daring to make a film that is in search of a script".

Accolades

In a 2006 survey, the Writers Guild of America named Adaptation the 77th best movie screenplay ever written.

Response from Susan Orlean 
Having been submitted the screenplay for approval, Susan Orlean was strongly opposed to the making of the film; she ended up reluctantly approving its production and was ultimately very impressed with the final result. In 2012, she said, "[reading the screenplay] was a complete shock. My first reaction was 'Absolutely not!' They had to get my permission and I just said: 'No! Are you kidding? This is going to ruin my career!' Very wisely, they didn't really pressure me. They told me that everybody else had agreed and I somehow got emboldened. It was certainly scary to see the movie for the first time. It took a while for me to get over the idea that I had been insane to agree to it, but I love the movie now."

Orlean called Streep's portrayal of her "one of my favorite performances by her" and appreciated that her version of the character was based not on the real Orlean but on how Streep imagined Orlean based on The Orchid Thief. Despite the film's fictional parts, Orlean praised its fidelity to the book's spirit: "What I admire the most is that it's very true to the book's themes of life and obsession, and there are also insights into things which are much more subtle in the book about longing, and about disappointment."

See also
Films
 Identity (2003), a film starring John Cusack containing plot elements similar to The 3, the fictional script by Donald Kaufman's character. 
 Three (2006), a  film (based on Ted Dekker's eponymous novel), which bears a distinct resemblance to the plot of The 3.
 List of films featuring fictional films

Literature

Notes

References

External links

 
 
 Adaptation at BeingCharlieKaufman.com
 
 
 Susan Orlean's original article for The New Yorker
 Adaptation, Shooting Script, by Charlie Kaufman, Spike Jonze. Nick Hern Books, 2002. .

2002 comedy-drama films
2002 films
American comedy-drama films
American satirical films
American black comedy films
BAFTA winners (films)
Columbia Pictures films
2000s English-language films
Cultural depictions of American men
Cultural depictions of film directors
Cultural depictions of writers
Films about Hollywood, Los Angeles
Films about screenwriters
Films about twin brothers
Drama films based on actual events
Films based on non-fiction books
Films directed by Spike Jonze
Films featuring a Best Supporting Actor Academy Award-winning performance
Films featuring a Best Supporting Actor Golden Globe winning performance
Films featuring a Best Supporting Actress Golden Globe-winning performance
Films set in the 1990s
Films set in the United States
American nonlinear narrative films
Films with screenplays by Charlie Kaufman
Self-reflexive films
Metafictional works
Films whose writer won the Best Adapted Screenplay BAFTA Award
Films scored by Carter Burwell
Silver Bear Grand Jury Prize winners
Biographical films about writers
2000s American films